Sir William Johnson, CMG, CBE, QPM was an eminent English police officer.

Johnson joined Portsmouth City Police in 1920. In 1932 he was appointed as Chief Constable of Plymouth City Police. He became Assistant Chief Constable of Birmingham City Police in 1936, and was appointed Chief Constable in 1941. He served with Her Majesty's Inspectorate of Constabulary from 1945 to 1963: for the last two years of this period he was its inaugural Chief.

References

British Chief Constables
English recipients of the Queen's Police Medal
Commanders of the Order of the British Empire
Knights Bachelor
Chief Inspectors of Constabulary (England and Wales)
Companions of the Order of St Michael and St George
Year of birth missing
Year of death missing